The siege of Emesa in 638 was laid by a coalition force of Arab Christian tribes from Jazira which mustered by Heraclius in an attempt to stimy the losses of Byzantine territories due to rapid expansion of the Rashidun Caliphate in the Levant.

Background 
After the devastating defeat in the Battle of Yarmouk, the remainder of the Byzantine Empire was left vulnerable. With few military resources left, it was no longer in a position to attempt a military comeback in Syria. To gain time to prepare a defense of the rest of his empire, Heraclius needed the Muslims occupied in Syria.

Heraclius thus sought help from the Christian Arab tribes which came of Jazirah which particularly came from two cities along the Euphrates river, Circesium and Hīt. The tribes mustered a large army and marched against Emesa in no time, which was erected as military headquarter by Abu Ubaydah at the time.

Caliphate strategy 
Acknowledging a huge Arab Christian army marching to his position, Abu Ubaidah withdrew all his forces from northern Syria to Emesa as a part of a complex strategy which he devised to repel the massive invasion of the Christian Arabs against Emesa, while Caliph Umar instructed Abu Ubaydah to send his field commanders outside of Emesa with sufficient splinter forces to lay counter siege to cities in Jazira, the homeland of enemy Arab Christian tribes, in order to divert the focus of enemy concentration in Emesa. So the splinter forces under Iyadh ibn Ghanm In 638 the Muslims attacked Hīt, which they found to be well fortified; thus, they left a fraction of the army to impose a siege on the city, while the rest went after Circesium. Iyadh in turn sent Habib ibn Maslama al-Fihri toward Circesium taking with him a particular division of Banu Kilab known as Corps of 'Amr, which are famed for their 'militant and warlike attitude. The division is directly under the leadership of Aslam ibn Zur'a al-Kilabi along with al-Harith ibn Yazid and his son Zufar ibn al-Harith.

Meanwhile, Umar sent a detachment from Iraq to invade Jazirah from three different routes. Umar himself marched from Medina with 1,000 men. On the orders of Umar, Sa'd ibn Abi Waqqas, who had recently conquered Iraq, sent Another detachment to assist Emesa under Al-Qa'qa' ibn Amr al-Tamimi, a prominent veteran of both Battle of Yarmouk and Battle of Qadisiyyah. Another detachment from Suhayl ibn 'Uday followed al-Farad road until they reached Raqqa.

Siege 
After the large contingent of Arab Christians came from Jazira has been mustered, they immediately marched to Homs, which immediately laid siege to the city. As Khalid just returned from conquest of Qinnasrin, he immediately appealed to Abu Ubaydah to be sen outside so he can led the sally outside the wall, However Abu Ubaidah decided they should wait behind the wall, while he waited for reinforcements

Counter siege 
The sieges toward Circessium and Hit laid by corps under Iyadh occurred simultaneously as the siege of Homs goes on. At first the Muslims faced difficulty in the siege of Hit as the defenders dug a moat around the city, until the Muslim army was able to penetrate it. Meanwhile, Circesium was captured from the Byzantines without resistance by a Muslim army commanded by Habib, Though many Muslim sources state this occurred in 637, Maximillan Streck stated it is more likely occurred in 640.

The counter sieges not only stopped on Circesium and Hit, as Iyadh further sent Walid ibn Uqba to subdue the fortresses of the tribe of Rabi'a and Tanukhid. Abu Ubaydah strategy of counter siege toward circesium and Hit not only resulted in a Muslim victory at the Second Battle of Emesa against the pro-Byzantine Christian Arabs of Jazira, but also succeeded to take both Circesium and Hit, while the Christian Arabs still being pursued by Khalid and his relentless cavalry from behind. Between the end of 639 and December 640, Iyad and his lieutenants subdued, in succession, Circesium (al-Qarqisiya), Amid, Mayyafariqin, Nisibin, Tur Abdin, Mardin, Dara, Qarda and Bazabda. In the case of Raqqa (Kallinikos to the Byzantines), the peasants outside the city walls were defended by the Arab Christian nomads. There, the Muslim forces compelled the city's leaders, facing the prospect of starvation, to surrender within five or six days. As the city fell to the Muslims, Since then, it has figured in Arabic sources as al-Raqqah.

End of siege 
When the Christian Arabs received the news of the arrival of fresh reinforcements led by the caliph himself, combined with Iyadh invasions of their homeland in Jazira, they immediately abandoned the siege and hastily withdrew there. By the time the Christian Arab coalitions leave, Khalid and his mobile guard has been reinforced by 4000 soldiers under Qa'qa from Iraq, and now has been given permission by Abu Ubaydah to came out of the fort to pursue the enemy. Khalid inflicted heavy losses to the Arab Christian coalition forces, which not only broke the entire siege, but also prevented them to return to Jazira.

In summary, The objective of Jazira invasion by Iyadh to capture cities with minimal destruction and In Petersen's view, Iyad's campaign partially diverted the Christian Arab coalition forces in Syria has succeeded.

Aftermath 
The success of the defense, which not only repelled the siege attempt by the Byzantine allies but also allowed Iyadh to capture almost entire Jazira region, has motivated the caliphate to launch the full-scale invasion further to the north until it reached Armenia.

See also 
 Siege of Emesa
 Jund Hims
 Muslim conquest of Armenia

References

Bibliography

 

Emesa
Emesa
Emesa
Emesa
Emesa
630s in the Byzantine Empire
Homs
Muslim conquest of the Levant
Emesa
Heraclius
637